The Emerging Drugs Network of Australia (EDNA) is a collaborative multi-agency project to detect new illicit drugs, and their clinical effects. It is also designed as an early warning system for public health systems across Australia, and to inform policy and decision making processes.
The early warning system involves sharing of information between emergency department physicians, toxicologists, and forensic laboratories across the country. This allows emerging trends to be discovered, and for specific treatment measures to be developed based on objective data.

The EDNA started from research conducted at Royal Perth Hospital, initiated after a large number of patients were hospitalised after consuming a drug, which they thought was ecstasy, on New Year's Eve 2013. In 2016, two patients in the intensive care unit were found to have consumed a toxic synthetic drug NBOMe. A quick public health response, including a warning by Western Australian police and pictures of the capsules, is though to have prevented serious illnesses and deaths by deterring some people from taking the drug, according to a report by Royal Perth Hospital emergency doctors David McCutcheon and Jessamine Soderstrom presented to the New South Wales Coroners Court's 2019 inquest into the drug-related deaths at music festivals.

New South Wales Health supported the EDNA initiative in 2019, and in 2020 the program received $3.7 million in federal funding over five years.

References

Further reading
 
  Webinar video.

Drugs in Australia